Cold Spring Harbor is a station on the Long Island Rail Road's Port Jefferson Branch at West Pulaski Road and East Gate Drive, just south of Woodbury Road in West Hills, New York.

History

A station was built in Nassau (then Queens) County in December 1875 in Woodbury as "Woodbury station", as an extension of the Hicksville and Syosset Railroad. It was renamed "Cold Spring station" on October 15, 1880, when the southern part of Laurel Hollow, New York was still known as Cold Spring. Sometime between 1901 and 1902 it was moved east to the now Cold Springs Hills community of the hamlet of West Hills, New York and took its current name of Cold Spring Harbor name. The station was razed then rebuilt in 1948. In 1970 the station was electrified, along with the rest of the Port Jefferson Branch between Mineola and Huntington stations. Since 2007, the station has served as the western terminus of New York State Bicycle Route 25A.

Station layout
The station has two high-level side platforms. Platform A is 12 cars long and Platform B is eight cars long. One inbound morning train and three outbound evening trains stop at the opposite platform.

References

External links 

Hicksville & Cold Spring Harbor Branch Map; 1855 (Arrt's Arrchives)
Unofficial LIRR History Website
March 1999 and February 2007 Station Photos
Platforms, Tracks and Pedestrian Bridge

Long Island Rail Road stations in Suffolk County, New York
Huntington, New York
Railway stations in the United States opened in 1875